Eleftherios Venizelos 1910-1927 is a 1980 Greek biographical film of one of the most famous leaders of the Greek political scene of the 20th century Eleftherios Venizelos.  The film stars Dimitris Myrat, Manos Katrakis and Anna Kalouta.

Plot
The story was set in August 1909 when the film introduces Venizelos' ideas and Venizelism for a larger Greece.  It describes the capture of Thessaloniki and Ioannina and later the National Schism and up to the impending war in Europe, World War I.  Venizelos resigned from the political life after the tie in the elections that followed the Asia Minor Catastrophe and returned to his relatives in Crete.

Cast
Minas Christidis .... Eleftherios Venizelos
Giannis Voglis .... King Constantine I of Greece
Dimitris Myrat .... King George I of Greece
Manos Katrakis .... Petros
Olga Karlatos .... Queen Sophia of Greece
Anna Kalouta .... actress
Stavros Xenidis .... Emmanouil Repoulis
Vasilis Diamantopoulos .... Apostolos
Gregoris Valtinos .... officer

External links

Eleftherios Venizelos 1910-1927 at cine.gr 

1980 films
1980s Greek-language films
Greek biographical films
Eleftherios Venizelos
Films set in 1909
Films set in Greece
Films directed by Pantelis Voulgaris
1980s biographical films